RBST or rBST may refer to:

 Randomized binary search tree, a computer data structure
 Rare Breeds Survival Trust, a UK charity
 Recombinant bovine somatotropin (usually "rBST"), a synthetic growth hormone controversially used in dairy farming